The Boy Scout Preserve is an  area of protected land in New Port Richey, Pasco County, Florida.

Background
The preserve is adjacent to the Robert K. Rees Memorial Park and the Robert Crown Wilderness Area west of U.S. Route 19 in New Port Richey. It was acquired in 2010 and includes "historically significant fire rings from its days as a former Boy Scouts of America camping ground", according to the Pasco County website. The preserve also maintains coastal hammock, salt marsh and mangrove swamp habitats for species including roseate spoonbill, white ibis and reddish egret.

See also
West Central Florida Council

References

External links
Trail map
Location map

Parks in Pasco County, Florida
New Port Richey, Florida